</noinclude>

The  is a Jōmon archaeological site in the town of Sotogahama, Aomori Prefecture, in the Tōhoku region of northern Japan. Excavations in 1998 uncovered forty-six earthenware fragments which have been dated as early as 14,500 BC (ca 16,500 BP); this places them among the earliest pottery currently known. As the earliest in Japan, this marks the transition from the Japanese Paleolithic to Incipient Jōmon. Other pottery of a similar date has been found at Gasya and Khummi on the lower Amur River. Such a date puts the development of pottery before the warming at the end of the Pleistocene.

Overview
Pottery shards found during the rebuilding of a private residence in 1998 were submitted for radiocarbon dating by the Aomori Prefectural Board of Education, and were found to have been produced 16,500 years ago, making it the oldest known pottery in the world at that time. Further finds included axes, spearheads, arrowheads, scapers, blades, and anvils, mostly of local shale but some also of obsidian. The arrowheads are of special significance as they push back the beginnings of the history of archery. As no indication of permanent dwellings have been found at the site, it is assumed that the ancient inhabitants of this area were still nomadic.

The site forms part of a serial nomination submitted in 2009 for future inscription on the UNESCO World Heritage List, under criteria iii and iv: Jōmon Archaeological Sites in Hokkaidō, Northern Tōhoku, and other regions. Work began on the site in 2019 to improve public access to a section of the excavated area.

Dating
Thirty of the forty-six fragments of pottery, all from the same vessel, had carbonized residues, suggesting its use for the cooking of foodstuffs. Eight AMS radiocarbon dates were generated from five of the fragments and three pieces of associated charred wood; these suggested a date of 11,800 to 11,500 BC. With calibration, this dating was pushed back to 14,500 to 14,000, as early as around 16,500 BP. Other datings have given a range between 13780 ± 170 and 12680 ± 140 BC. This makes the Odai Yamamoto I site important to the understanding of the transition between the Pleistocene and the Holocene. In recognition of their importance, the excavated artifacts have been designated a Municipal Cultural Property.

Stoneware and pottery excavated from the Odai Yamamoto I site is preserved at the Oyama Furusato Museum at Oyama Elementary School. The site received protection as a National Historic Site of Japan in 2013.

Genetics 
Jōmon samples from the Ōdai Yamamoto I site differ from Jōmon samples of Hokkaido and geographically close eastern Honshu. Ōdai Yamamoto Jōmon were found to have C1a1 and are genetically close to ancient and modern Northeast Asian groups but notably different from other Jōmon samples such as Ikawazu or Urawa Jōmon. Similarly, the Nagano Jōmon from the Yugora cave site are closely related to contemporary East Asians but genetically different from the Ainu people which are direct descendants of the Hokkaido Jōmon.

One study, published in the Cambridge University Press in 2020, suggests that the Jōmon people were rather heterogeneous, and that many Jōmon groups were descended from an ancient "Altaic-like" population (close to modern Tungusic-speakers, samplified by Oroqen), which established itself over the local hunter gatherers. This “Altaic-like” population migrated from Northeast Asia in about 6000BC, and coexisted with other unrelated tribes and/or intermixed with them, before being replaced by the later Yayoi people. C1a1 and C2 are linked to the "Tungusic-like people", which arrived in the Jōmon period archipelago from Northeast Asia in about 6,000 BC and introduced the Incipient Jōmon culture, typified by early ceramic cultures such as the Ōdai Yamamoto I Site.

See also
 Jōmon Archaeological Sites in Hokkaidō, Northern Tōhoku, and other regions
 List of Historic Sites of Japan (Aomori)
 Thermoluminescence dating

References

Archaeological sites in Japan
Japanese pottery
Ancient pottery
Jōmon period
Sotogahama, Aomori
1998 archaeological discoveries